U.S. Route 23 (US 23) is a part of the U.S. Highway System that travels from Jacksonville, Florida to Mackinaw City, Michigan. In the U.S. state of Tennessee, the highway travels  in the northeastern part of the state from the North Carolina state line at Sam's Gap in the Bald Mountains, north to the Virginia state line in Kingsport. With a predominant concurrency with Interstate 26 (I-26), US 23 is a divided four-lane freeway that follows Corridor B of the Appalachian Development Highway System (ADHS) and serves as a major thoroughfare in the Tri-Cities. Although I-26 is technically an east-west route, the highway predominantly travels in a north-south alignment in Tennessee.

The freeway was first authorized by the Appalachian Regional Development Act of 1965, which created the ADHS, and the stretch between Johnson City and the Virginia state line was constructed in segments between 1968 and 1986. In addition to US 23, this freeway was designated as State Route 137 (SR 137) and later Interstate 181 (I-181), and was commonly referred to as "Appalachian Highway" in its early years. In 1988, the American Association of State Highway Transportation Officials approved an extension of I-26 from Asheville, North Carolina, to I-81 in Tennessee. The remainder of the freeway was completed in 1995, and the stretch between the North Carolina state line and I-81 was redesignated as I-26 in 2003. After an initial denial, I-26 was extended north to Kingsport in 2007, replacing the remainder of I-181.

Route description

The freeway begins at the Virginia state line at a partial interchange with State Routes 36 (the old route of US 23) and 346, where the route continues into Virginia as a four-lane divided highway. Here, a pair of one-lane ramps carry US 23 and unsigned SR 137 across both routes; SR 346 is not directly accessible from the freeway, and the southbound lanes are indirectly accessible from SR 23 via an entrance ramp from SR 346. Here, the freeway curves to the southwest, and then to the southeast a short distance later, zig-zagging over the next few miles through a predominantly residential area on the outskirts of Kingsport. The freeway then reaches a partial cloverleaf interchange with US 11W, where I-26 begins, and transitions into a more direct north-south alignment. The interstate immediately crosses the Holston River, which is split into two channels here by a wide island called Long Island, on a long pair of viaducts. It then begins a steep ascent over the north end of Bays Mountain, where the eastbound lanes utilize a truck climbing lane. Passing through a deep artificial cut at the top of the mountain, the route then begins a descent, where the westbound lanes also contain a truck lane. A short distance later, the interstate reaches a partial cloverleaf interchange with SR 93 (John B. Dennis Bypass), which continues to the north as a controlled-access bypass of Kingsport. 

Leaving Kingsport, I-26 continues over the next several miles southeastwardly through a semi-residential area, crossing several ridges characteristic of the topography of the area, and curving sharply to the west and then back to the east. It then reaches I-81 at a cloverleaf interchange near the Colonial Heights community. It then curves back into a northwest-to-southeast alignment, passing a mix of farmland and rural residential areas over the next , before reaching an interchange with SR 75 in the Gray community. The interstate continues over the next  through additional farmland and neighborhoods, before reaching an interchange with SR 354, which provides access to Jonesborough to the southwest. A short distance later, the freeway enters the western part of Johnson City, where it has in interchange with SR 381, which serves as a western bypass of the city and also provides access to Bristol. About  later, the interstate has a near-full cloverleaf interchange with US Routes 11E and 19W (Roan Street), where it begins a concurrency with the latter. It then continues over the next few miles through a dense residential area, before passing near the business district of Johnson City, where it has interchanges with SR 400 and SR 19 in short succession. A short distance later, the freeway reaches an interchange with US 321 and SR 67, which provides access to East Tennessee State University, as well as Elizabethton to the northeast. Beyond this point, the interstate passes through the mostly residential southern tip of Johnson City along the northern base of Buffalo Mountain, where it gradually transitions into a more direct north-south alignment and enters the Blue Ridge Mountains. Leaving Johnson City, the interstate then briefly passes Carter County, and gradually begins to curve to the southwest, entering a valley between Buffalo Mountain to the west and the Bald Mountains subrange to the east. 

I-26 continues over the next several miles in a relatively straight alignment, where it passes the town of Unicoi. A few miles later, the interstate reaches Erwin, where it has interchanges with the northern terminus of SR 81. Meandering through a valley that is even narrower at this point, the route reaches an interchange a few miles later where US 19W splits off. Shortly beyond this point is an interchange with a local road, which also contains the westbound Tennessee Welcome Center. This stretch also passes through multiple artificial rock cuts where mesh fences and retaining walls are used to mitigate the effects of rockslides, and crosses three stream valleys on long viaducts, which also act as wildlife underpasses. Near the top of this ascent is an eastbound scenic overlook. About  later, the interstate reaches Sam's Gap, where the westbound lanes contain a large truck inspection and parking station, and crosses into North Carolina.

History

Background and early history
A proposal to construct a road between Johnson City and Asheville, North Carolina existed as early as 1919. US 23 was established in 1930 with a complete concurrency with SR 36, from the North Carolina state line to the Virginia state line; going through Erwin, Unicoi, Johnson City and Kingsport. In 1952, US 23 was rerouted southwest of Ernestville, along SR 81 through Flag Pond and Sam's Gap into North Carolina; its old alignment remained part of US 19W/SR 36.

Appalachian Development Highway System and Interstate Highway era
The widening of US 23 to a four-lane highway between Asheville, North Carolina, and Johnson City, Tennessee, was authorized by the Appalachian Regional Development Act of 1965, which created the Appalachian Development Highway System. This stretch was designated as part of Corridor B, and the project was known as Project A-10. The first contract for construction was awarded on February 23, 1968, for the  stretch between I-81 and near the Gray community. On January 9, 1971, the segment of this highway located between SR 75 in Gray and SR 354 near Johnson City was opened. The segment between SR 354 and SR 381 opened on November 17, 1972. On July 1, 1975, the stretch between US 11W/US 19 and SR 19 (Market Street) in Johnson City opened. The section between SR 19 and south of US 321/SR 67 south of Johnson City was opened to northbound traffic on October 23, 1978, and to southbound traffic the following day, after nearly 16 months of delays. On November 13, 1981, the stretch between SR 93 and US 11W in Kingsport was dedicated and opened. The segment around Erwin between south of the Nolichucky River and north of Main Street, known at the time as the Erwin Bypass, opened on January 29, 1982. That same month, contracts were awarded for the stretch between south of US 321/SR 67 and Main Street in Erwin, and the stretch was dedicated and opened on June 20, 1986, after multiple delays.

While Tennessee continued to appropriate funds to construct the highway between Erwin an the Virginia state line, funds for ADHS corridors began lagging in the 1970s, and by the end of that decade, plans to upgrade the stretch over the Bald Mountains had largely stalled. State Representative Zane Whitson of Erwin, who was elected in 1978, campaigned on reviving the project, but it remained largely dormant until August 1985, when two planners from Johnson City suggested renumbering the route to Interstate 181 in order to make the highway eligible for additional federal funds. In 1986, the extension through the Bald Mountains was included as one of six new freeway projects dubbed "Bicentennial Parkways" in the Better Roads Program, passed by the Tennessee General Assembly. This program, which had been proposed and spearheaded by then-governor Lamar Alexander, increased the state's gasoline and diesel taxes to fund these freeway projects as well as a backlog of 15 projects that had been labeled as top priorities and other projects. The project was referred to in the plan as the "Interstate 181 Extension" and was expected to cost $95.5 million (equivalent to $ in ) at the time. The project was further accelerated the following year by then-new Governor Ned McWherter.

The contract for the first section of the extension,  between south of the Nolichucky River and near the Temple Hill Community, was awarded on February 16, 1990, On May 1, 1990, a groundbreaking ceremony was held, officiated by Governor McWherter. The section between Temple Hill and Flag Pond was awarded on January 2, 1991, and the  section between Flag Pond and Carver Road, near the southernmost runaway truck ramp, was awarded on May 21, 1991. Due to the mountainous setting, the project proved to be one of the most difficult and laborious projects ever undertaken by TDOT, and required nearly 25 million cubic yards of rock and dirt to be moved. In September 1992, a lawsuit was jointly filed against TDOT by the Tennessee Environmental Council, the Tennessee Chapter of the Sierra Club, the Tennessee Scenic Rivers Association, and the Good Earth Defense Fund alleging violations of the National Environmental Policy Act and the Clean Water Act. The suit was dropped when TDOT agreed to modify the design of the highway in order to be more environmentally *, which included additional erosion control measures and the construction of two wildlife underpass tunnels, nicknamed "bear boxes", under the highway. They also agreed to set up an environmental advisory agency for the department. On December 24, 1993, the section between the Nolichucky River and US 19W opened. On July 5, 1995, the final section opened to traffic in a dedication ceremony at Sam's Gap officiated by then-Governor Don Sundquist, former Governor McWherter, and Congressman Quillen, along with other state officials. The final cost of the extension was $170 million (equivalent to $ in ).

Designation history

The controlled-access highway that ran between Johnson City and Kingsport was initially established as Tennessee State Route 137 (SR 137), with this designation extended as new sections were completed. In 1982, US 23 was rerouted onto the freeway from its original alignment with SR 36, forming a concurrency with SR 137. On December 4, 1985, the stretch between I-81 and US 11W in Kingsport was renumbered Interstate 181 (I-181). The I-181 designation was extended south to US 321/SR 67 in Johnson City on June 9, 1986. Both of these redesignations replaced SR 137 but kept the US 23 designation, and exits were numbered according to US 23's mileage. This reduced SR 137 to its present-day designation between US 11W and the Virginia state line, all within Kingsport. 

In 1988, AASHTO approved an extension of I-26 from North Carolina to I-81, on contingent upon the completion and certification of the highway. On August 5, 2003, after completion of a  adjacent section of controlled-access highway in North Carolina, I-26 was extended west into Tennessee, replacing I-181 from Johnson City to I-81. AASHTO initially ruled against an extension of the I-26 designation along the remainder of I-181 to Kingsport, however, since federal guidelines usually require mainline interstate highways to end at a junction with another interstate highway, an international border, or a seacoast. TDOT had proposed to renumber that stretch as I-126, but rescinded that proposal later that year. The Safe, Accountable, Flexible, Efficient Transportation Equity Act: A Legacy for Users (SAFETEA-LU), signed into law on August 10, 2005, authorized the remainder of I-181 to be redesignated as part of I-26. This took place in March 2007, when I-181 was officially decommissioned, and replaced with I-26 signage.

Exit list
Old exit numbers were based on US 23 distances; new exit numbers are based on I-26 milemarkers.

See also
 
 
 Special routes of U.S. Route 23

References

External links

 
Transportation in Unicoi County, Tennessee
Transportation in Carter County, Tennessee
Transportation in Washington County, Tennessee
Transportation in Sullivan County, Tennessee
Freeways in Tennessee
23